Death Rides the Range is a 1939 American Western film directed by Sam Newfield. It was a Colony Pictures film.

Plot
A group of international scientists are after helium used for airships of a foreign power. FBI Special Agent Ken Baxter, "from nowhere and going the same place" and his sidekicks Pancho and Panhandle stop them.

Cast 
Ken Maynard as Ken Baxter
Fay McKenzie as Letty Morgan
Ralph Peters as Panhandle
Julian Rivero as Pancho
Charles King as Joe Larkin
John Elliott as Hiram Crabtree
Willy Castello as Dr. Flotow
Sven Hugo Borg as Baron Strakoff
Michael Vallon as Dr. Wahl
Julian Madison as Jim Morgan
Kenneth Rhodes as Slim
Tarzan as Tarzan, Ken's Horse

Soundtrack 
Kenneth Rhodes - "Get Along My Pal" (Written by Colin MacDonald)

References

External links 

1939 films
American Western (genre) films
American black-and-white films
Films directed by Sam Newfield
1939 Western (genre) films
Films about the Federal Bureau of Investigation
1930s English-language films
1930s American films